Fränkel (or Fraenkel) is a surname. Notable people with the surname include:

 Abraham Fraenkel (1891–1965), German-Israeli mathematician, known for Zermelo–Fraenkel set theory
 Albert Fränkel (1848–1916), German physician
 Aviezri Fraenkel (born 1929), Israeli mathematician
 Baruch Fränkel-Teomim (1760–1828), rabbi, Talmudist
 David ben Naphtali Fränkel (c. 1704–1762), German rabbi
 Eduard Fraenkel (1888–1965), German-English classical scholar
 Ernst Fränkel (physician) (1844–1921), German gynaecologist
 Ernst Fraenkel (linguist) (1881–1957), German linguist
 Ernst Fraenkel (political scientist) (1898–1975), German political scientist
 Hermann Fränkel (1888–1977), German-American classicist
 Heinz Fraenkel-Conrat (1910–1999), German biochemist
 Iwan Fränkel (born 1941), Surinamese footballer
 Jonas Fränkel (1773–1846), German banker and philanthropist
 Knut Frænkel (1870–1897), Swedish engineer and arctic explorer
 Leó Frankel (Léo Fränkel) (1844–1896), Hungarian communist revolutionary
 Naftali Frenkel, 16-year-old killed in the 2014 kidnapping and murder of Israeli teenagers
 Purrel Fränkel (born 1976), Surinamese footballer
 Ray Fränkel (born 1982), Dutch Surinamese footballer
 Samuel Fränkel (1801–1881), German textile manufacturer
 Sándor Ferenczi (1873–1933), Hungarian psychoanalyst, born Alexander Fränkel

See also 
 Frankel
 Frankl
 Frenkel